Matt More (born 25 November 1998) is a South African rugby union player for the  in the Currie Cup. His regular position is centre.

More was named in the  side for the 2021 Currie Cup Premier Division.

References

South African rugby union players
Living people
Rugby union centres
Pumas (Currie Cup) players
1998 births
Stormers players
Western Province (rugby union) players
Lions (United Rugby Championship) players
Golden Lions players
Tel Aviv Heat players
South African expatriate sportspeople in Israel
South African expatriate rugby union players
Expatriate rugby union players in Israel